Rodney Burgess (born November 27, 1984) is an American football tight end.

Burgess played college football at Coastal Carolina University and was originally pursued by the Detroit Lions, Minnesota Vikings, and Washington Redskins after the draft. He signed with the Lions on May 4, 2007, but was released in mid-May. The Giants signed him nine days later. He was then waived by the Giants in August.

He later signed with the Milwaukee Mustangs  of the AFL.

In 2011, Burgess got a job with Dish Network and sought a new career as a personal trainer.

References

1984 births
Living people
American football linebackers
American football tight ends
American football wide receivers
Coastal Carolina Chanticleers football players
Players of American football from South Carolina
People from Irmo, South Carolina